Vulkanny is an urban locality (an urban-type settlement) in Yelizovsky District of Kamchatka Krai, Russia. Population:

References 

Urban-type settlements in Kamchatka Krai